Venediktov (Russian: Венедиктов, Ukrainian: Венедіктов) is a Russian masculine surname originating from the Latin name Benedictus (meaning blessed); its feminine counterpart is Venediktova. It may refer to the following notable people:
Alexei Venediktov (born 1955), Russian journalist
Dimitri Venediktov, Deputy Health Minister of the Soviet Union
Lev Venediktov (1924–2017), Soviet and Ukrainian choral conductor
Iryna Venediktova, Ukrainian politician and lawyer

Russian-language surnames
Patronymic surnames
Surnames from given names